Khirbet ad-Deir, part of Teqoa, should not be confused with Khirbet ad-Deir in Hebron Governorate.

The town is built adjacent to the biblical site of Tekoa (Thecoe), now Khirbet Tuqu’, from which it takes its name. Today's town includes three other localities: Khirbet Ad Deir, Al Halkoom, and Khirbet Teqoa. According to the Palestinian Central Bureau of Statistics (PCBS), Teqoa had a population of 8,881 in 2007.

The town is a part of the 'Arab al-Ta'amira village cluster, along with Za'atara, Beit Ta'mir, Hindaza, Khirbet al-Deir and al-Asakra. Tuqu has a municipal jurisdiction of over 191,262 dunams, but its built-up area consists of 590 dunams, as 98.5% of the village's land was classified as Area C, and 1.5% as Area B in the 1995 accords. Situated in the immediate vicinity is the modern Israeli settlement of Tekoa, established in 1975 as a military outpost. Israeli settlements in the occupied West Bank, including East Jerusalem, are illegal under international law.

Etymology
Strong's Concordance states that Tekoa means in Hebrew "a stockade". Gesenius' lexicon uses "the pitching" in reference to tents.

Location
Teqoa is located 12 km (horizontal distance) south-east of Bethlehem. It is bordered by Teqoa wilds to the east, Jannatah town to the north, Al Manshiya and Marah Rabah to the west, and Al Maniya and Kisan villages to the south.

In the Hebrew Bible
According to biblical sources, Ephrathites from Bethlehem and the Calebites from Hebron founded Teqoa. Samuel talks of a "wise woman" of Tekoa in the time of David. King Rehoboam fortified the city and made it strategically important.
The people of Teqoa who returned from Babylon were Calebites, and they participated in rebuilding the walls of Jerusalem.

The location of biblical Teqoa is well defined in Scripture. In the Jewish Encyclopedia (1901), Isidore Singer notes that "the Greek text of a passage (Joshua 15:59) lost in the Hebrew [i.e., in the Masoretic Text] places it, together with Bethlehem and other towns of the hill-country of Judah, south of Jerusalem". Singer offers as secure the identification of the site at "Khirbat Taḳu'ah". Jeremiah places Teqoa in the south, and two other passages speak about the desert, or wilderness, of Tekoa ( and ). However,  describes the prophet as "a herdsman of Tekoa", suggesting that the land was reasonable for shepherding.

Archaeology of Khirbet Teqoa

Teqoa, the town known from the Hebrew Bible and other classical ancient sources, has been identified with Khirbet Teqoa ("ruins of Teqoa"), immediately east of modern Teqoa, both of which are c. 5 miles (8 km) south of Bethlehem, also spelled Khirbet al-Tuq'u. 

Various ruins were seen at the site in the mid-19th century. These included the walls of houses, cisterns, broken columns and heaps of building stones, some of which had "bevelled edges" which supposedly indicated ancient Jewish origin.

History of excavation
Khirbet Teqoa (Grid Ref. 170100/115600), has been excavated by Martin Heicksen (1968), John J. Davis (1970), and Sayf al-Din Haddad (1981).

Periods
The main periods of habitation brought to light by archaeological digs at Khirbet Teqoa are the Iron Age II, and the Byzantine period. Less well represented are the Iron Age IIb, Persian, Early and Late Roman, and medieval (Crusader to Mamluk) periods.

Byzantine-period remnants
The Bible indicates Teqoa as the birthplace of prophet Amos, and from the 4th century CE on a tomb alleged to be his was said to be visible at the village. A chapel built over the tomb is attested in the 6th century and is mentioned again in the 8th. The ruins consist of a double cave over what was a baptismal font, mosaic floors; a Monophysite monastery is located near the tomb. Byzantine ceramics have been found. The remains of the Byzantine church and monastery are still visible.

When Victor Guérin visited the site in 1863, he described the remains of an almost completely destroyed church, and an octagonal baptismal font, carved into a monolithic block of reddish limestone, measuring a meter and ten centimeters deep inside, and one meter thirty centimeters in diameter. On different sides of the octagon crosses were carved. At the bottom of the baptismal font the water flowed through an opening into a tank. The Survey of Western Palestine, with data collected between 1872 and 1877, refers again to the font: "There is also a very fine octagonal font about 4 feet high and 4 feet 3 inches diameter of inscribed circle; on every other side is a design. Two of these designs represent crosses, a third is a wreath, the fourth is formed by two squares interlaced diagonally to one another. The font is of good reddish stone."

A magical amulet etched on a silver plate and written in Aramaic is among the findings from the Byzantine period. The amulet contains 16 lines, 11 of which use Hebrew script; the others show magic characters. It dates to the fifth to seventh centuries CE, and is currently located in the SBF Museum, Jerusalem.

Other archaeological sites and landmarks

The site of Khirbet Teqoa is considered "qualified in terms of tourism". A second archaeological site near Teqoa, Khirbet Umm El 'Amd, is "not qualified" in terms of tourism. The New Lavra of Saint Sabas (est. 507) is today in ruins at the site of Bir el-Wa'ar, c. 3 km south of Tuqu'.

Paleolithic caves in Wadi Khureitun
Outside Teqoa, adjacent to the Israeli settlement of Tekoa is Wadi Khureitun, sometimes spelled Khreiton ("Chariton Valley"). The valley is notable for containing three prominent caves inhabited since the Paleolithic era: Umm Qatfa, Umm Qala'a and Erq al-Ahmar. The latter was inhabited since 8,000 BCE and traces of fire have been found in Umm Qala'a, dating back 500,000 years.

History of Teqoa

Hellenistic period
During the Maccabean Revolt it was fortified by the Greek general Bacchides (Josephus, Ant. XIII, 15).

Roman period
Josephus again mentions Teqoa in connection with the First Jewish–Roman War (Life 420, War IV, 518). Eusebius (c. 260s-340) mentions a village by the name of Teqoa (Onomasticon 98:17, etc.).

Byzantine period
Teqoa is again mentioned in Byzantine sources.

Muslim conquest and Early Muslim period
Teqoa was captured by during the Muslim conquest of Syria and with time, several of its inhabitants converted to Islam. There was a significant nomadic Bedouin presence in the village's vicinity.

Crusader and Ayyubid period
Teqoa was known as "Casal Techue" by the Crusaders who conquered Palestine in 1099. Its Christian residents welcomed the Crusaders. Medieval chronicler William of Tyre relates that the Christians of the village aided the Crusaders during the Siege of Jerusalem in 1099, by guiding them to local springs and food sources. Many of the villagers also joined the Crusader army.

In 1108, the Russian traveller Abbot Daniel noted that Casal Techue was "a very big village" with a mixed Christian and Muslim population. The village was granted by King Fulk and Queen Melisende to the canons of the Holy Sepulchre in 1138 in exchange for Bethany, the concession allowing the inhabitants to collect bitumen and 'salt' from the Dead Sea shores. The area's population included villeins comprising local Christians and Muslims, the latter being Islamised former Christians, and apparently also recent Frankish (West European) settlers, with Bedouin living outside the village.

The ruins of a castle, a Frankish manor house from the period, are found at Khirbat at-Teqoa at the edge of the biblical and Byzantine archaeological mound, some 41x48x60 m in size, and protected by a rock-cut ditch.

Zengid forces captured Casal Techue in 1138. The Knights Templar under Robert the Burgundian managed to recapture the town easily, but experienced their first military defeat when Zengid forces counterattacked, leaving the area between the town and Hebron "strewn with Templar bodies" according to William of Tyre. He blamed the Templars' defeat on their failure to pursue fleeing Muslim forces which allowed them to regroup just outside Casal Techue.

Syrian geographer Yaqut al-Hamawi described it as "a village famous for its honey" during a visit there in 1225, during Ayyubid rule.

Ottoman period
Teqoa, like all of Palestine, was incorporated into the Ottoman Empire in 1517. According to an Ottoman census in 1526, 82 families lived in the village, 55 of which were Christians. In 1596 the village appeared in Ottoman tax registers as being in the Nahiya of Quds of the Liwa of Quds. It had a population of 62 Muslim households and five Christian households. The villagers paid taxes on wheat, barley, olives, vines or fruit trees, and goats or beehives; a total of 27,000 akçe. All of the revenue went to a waqf.

The majority of Teqoa's Christian inhabitants emigrated to Bethlehem in the 18th century. Teqoa's Christian migrants formed Bethlehem's Qawawsa Quarter.

French explorer Victor Guérin visited the place in 1863, and he described finding the scarce remains of a church, and an octagonal baptismal font.

The PEF's Survey of Western Palestine in 1883 mentions that Khurbet Tequa "seems to have been large and important in Christian times. It is still inhabited by a few persons living in the caves [...]"

Jordanian period
The modern town of Teqoa was established in 1948 during Jordanian rule. The inhabitants were Bedouin tribesmen from the 'Arab al-Ta'amira tribe. In 1961, the population was 555.

Post-1967

During the Six-Day War in 1967, Teqoa came under Israeli occupation, remaining so until this day. The population in the 1967 census conducted by the Israeli authorities was 1,362.

Over the years, Israel has confiscated 1436 dunams of Teqoa's land for the construction of three Israeli settlements: Tekoa, Mitzpe Shalem, and a resort, Metzoke Dragot. In addition, the settlers have constructed various outposts.

In May 2001, after the killing of two Jewish Israeli boys outside the nearby Israeli settlement of Tekoa, Teqoa was temporarily sealed off by the Israeli Army. Consequently, residents could not reach their jobs in Bethlehem and Israel, and shepherds could not reach grazing lands outside the village.

Demographics
According to a 1997 census by the Palestinian Central Bureau of Statistics (PCBS), Teqoa had a population of 4,890 inhabitants. There were only 24 Palestinian refugees, making up 0.5% of the population. There were 2,534 males and 2,356 females. Tuqu's population grew to 8,881 in the 2007 PCBS census. There were 1,368 households, with the average household size consisting of between six and seven members. The gender ratio was 49% women and 51% men.

Teqoa has a Muslim majority and there are ten mosques in the town. They are the following: Abu Bakr as-Siddik Mosque, Bilal Ibn Rabah Mosque, al-Sahaba Mosque, al-Tawba Mosque, Abd al-Rahman Ibn 'Oof Mosque, Zaid Ibn Haritha Mosque, al-Abbas Mosque and Salah ad-Deen Mosque, al-Ansar Mosque and Ali Ibn Abi Talib Mosque. Most of the inhabitants belong to the 'Arab al-Ta'amira tribe. Principal clans include Badan, Jibreen, Sha'er, 'Emur, Nawawra, 'Urooj, Abu Mifrih, az-Zawahra, Sbeih, at-Tnooh, Sleiman and Sabbah.

Economy
Agriculture, particularly livestock, dominates Teqoa's economy. Dairy is produced and sold in local markets and in Bethlehem. Industry is virtually nonexistent, although there is a stone quarry and brick factory in the town. Unemployment is high at about 50% and mostly caused by Israeli restrictions on movement and access to the labor market in Israel proper as a result of the Second Intifada between 2000 and 2004.

As of 2008 around 45% of Teqoa's workforce was employed in the Israeli labor market while another 30% worked in agriculture. The remainder of economic activity was split between employment in the Palestinian government or trade and services. Efforts have been made to attract tourists. A municipal center was built near the ruins of a Byzantine church in Teqoa. Tuqu' is well known for its vegetables.

Government
98.5% of Teqoa's land area has been located in Area C (West Bank), or Nature reserves since 1995, thus giving the Palestinian National Authority no control over its administration and civil affairs. Originally, twelve tribal elders managed the town, but unable to plan and carry out internal improvements, they ceded their power to a council of younger men. The 13-member municipal council was established in 1997 to administer Teqoa as well as the villages of Khirbet al-Deir, al-Halqum and Khirbet Tuqu' which were put under Tuqu's jurisdiction. Its first mayor, Suleiman Abu Mufarreh, initiated the construction of the municipal hall and recovered Tuqu's stolen baptismal font, relocating it to the front of the municipal hall.

Teqoa is governed by a municipal council consisting of eleven members, including the mayor. In the 2005 Palestinian municipal elections, the Hamas-backed Reform list won the majority of the seats (eight), while the independent local United Teqoa list won three. Reform member Khaled Ahmad Hamida won the post of mayor, succeeding Raed Hamida.

References

Bibliography

 
 

   

 (pp.  183 ff, Tekoa)
 (pp. 43-44, no. 174)

External links
 Welcome To Taqu'
 Tekoa, Welcome to Palestine
Survey of Western Palestine, Map 21:  IAA, Wikimedia commons
 Tuqu' Town (Fact Sheet), Applied Research Institute–Jerusalem (ARIJ)
Tuqu’ Town Profile, ARIJ
Tuqu’ aerial photo, ARIJ

Towns in the West Bank
Populated places in the Bethlehem Governorate
Hebrew Bible cities
Books of Samuel
Municipalities of the State of Palestine